Suva is the capital and largest city of Fiji. It is the home of the country's largest metropolitan area and serves as its major port. The city is located on the southeast coast of the island of Viti Levu, in Rewa Province, Central Division.

In 1877, the capital of Fiji was moved to Suva from Levuka, the main European colonial settlement at the time, due to its restrictive geography and environs. The administration of the colony was transferred from Levuka to Suva in 1882.

As of the 2017 census, the city of Suva had a population of 93,970, and Suva's metropolitan area, which includes its independent suburbs, had a population of 185,913. The combined urban population of Suva and the towns of Lami, Nasinu, and Nausori that border it was around 330,000: over a third of the nation's population. (This urban complex, excluding Lami, is also known as the Suva-Nausori corridor.)

Suva is the political, economic, and cultural centre of Fiji. It is also the economic and cultural capital of the South Pacific, hosting the majority of the regional headquarters of major international corporations, international agencies, and diplomatic missions. The city also has a thriving arts and performance scene, and a growing reputation as the region's fashion capital.

History

In 1868, when Suva was still a small village, the Bauan chieftain, Seru Epenisa Cakobau, granted  of land to the Australian-based Polynesia Company, in exchange for the company's promise to pay off debts owed to the United States. More than a tenth of this land area, was located near Suva. The company's original intention was to develop a cotton farming industry, but the land and climate proved unsuitable.  

In 1874, control of the Fiji Islands was ceded to the United Kingdom. In 1877, the colonial authorities decided to move the capital to Suva from Levuka, Ovalau, Lomaiviti, because Levuka's location between a steep mountain and the sea made any expansion of the town impractical. Colonel F.E. Pratt of the Royal Engineers was appointed Surveyor-General in 1875 and designed the new capital in Suva, assisted by W. Stephens and Colonel R.W. Stewart. The transfer to Suva was made official in 1882.

In 1910, Suva acquired the status of a municipality, under the Municipal Constitution Ordinance of 1909. In October of that year, Suva was officially designated a city – Fiji's first. Suva later annexed Tamavua. Most recently, Suva further extended its boundaries by incorporating the Cunningham area at its northern edge. Since then, urban sprawl has led to the growth of a number of suburbs that remain outside the city limits. Together with the city, they form the metropolitan area known as the Greater Suva Area.

Suva hosted the South Pacific Games in 2003 for the third time in the event's 40-year history. In preparation for hosting the event, the Fijian government, with the help of a $16 million aid package from the People's Republic of China, funded the construction of a new gymnasium, indoor sports centre, swimming pool, stadium, field hockey pitch, and grandstands in the area around Suva.

Geography and physical characteristics

Suva is not only the capital of Fiji, but also its commercial and political centre (though not necessarily its cultural centre), and its main port city. It has a mix of modern buildings and colonial-period architecture. 

Suva is located around a harbour on a hilly peninsula in the southeast corner of Viti Levu Island, between Laucala Bay and Suva Harbour. The mountains to its north and west catch the southeast trade winds, producing year-round moist conditions.

Although Suva is on a peninsula, and almost surrounded by sea, its coast is lined with mangroves- the nearest beach is 40 kilometres (25 mi) away, at Pacific Harbour. A significant part of the city centre, including the Parliament buildings, is built on reclaimed mangrove swampland.

Central
Suva is divided into six wards. Its central business district, which is in what is known as the Central Ward, occupies almost the whole southwestern side of the peninsula.

City wards
Below is a list of the city's six wards, beginning with the city centre, followed by the northernmost ward, and then in clockwise order:

 Central: city centre; central business district
 Tamavua: urban; residential
 Cunningham: semi-urban; residential
 Nabua: urban; residential and industrial; has its own separate town centre; includes a military base and the Southern Division Police Headquarters
 Samabula: urban; residential and industrial (with large industrial zones); has its own separate town centre; includes a university
 Muanikau: urban; residential; includes large sporting venues, a university, and recreational areas

Suva–Nausori Corridor
Suva sits in the middle of a metropolitan area, sometimes known as the Suva Urban Complex, and sometimes informally known as Suva, even though it encompasses a total of four areas with their own town or city names and their own separate local governments. This conurbation stretches from Lami (immediately west of the city of Suva) along the Queens Highway, through Nasinu (immediately east of the city of Suva), to the Rewa River, along the Kings Highway, and then to Nausori across the river. To the north and northeast are the rainforest-park areas of Colo-i-Suva and Sawani, along the Princes Road, which connect at the Rewa River Bridge. This whole area (excluding Lami) is also formally referred to as the Suva–Nausori Corridor. It is the most populous area in Fiji, with over 330,000 inhabitants.

Climate

Suva has a tropical rainforest climate, according to the Köppen climate classification system. But because of its trade winds and occasional cyclones, it is not an equatorial climate. The city sees a copious amount of precipitation throughout the year, with no true dry season; no month has an average rainfall below . Suva averages  of precipitation annually. Its driest month, July, averages . Suva experiences so much precipitation during all 12 months of the year that the term "fine weather" in a weather report means only "not actually raining".

Suva has a markedly higher rainfall than Nadi or the western side of Viti Levu (known to Suva inhabitants as "the burning west"). The second governor of Fiji, Sir Arthur Gordon, is said to have remarked that he had never seen it rain anywhere the way it rains in Suva and that there was hardly a day without rain. The most copious rainfall is observed from November to May, while the slightly cooler months from June to October see considerably more moderate rainfall.

Demographics

Suva is a multiracial and multicultural city. Indigenous Fijians and Indo-Fijians, the two principal ethnic groups of Fiji, comprise the bulk of Suva's population, and the city is home to most of Fiji's ethnic minority populations, which include Rotumans, Lauans, Rambians, Caucasians (Europeans known as Kaivalagi), part-Europeans (of European and Fijian descent, known as “Kailoma") and Chinese, amongst others. The most widely spoken language is English, but Fijian, Hindustani, and other languages are also spoken by their respective communities.

Suva's inhabitants are representative of all the major indigenous Pacific groups: it is sometimes referred to as the “New York of the Pacific". The city has a reputation as a major economic centre in the region and is the site of University of the South Pacific's main campus: This has led to an influx of Pacific migrants, who study, work, and live in the city and its boroughs.

Municipal government

Suva has municipal status and, until 2009, was governed by a lord mayor and a 20-member city council. The Suva City Council was the municipal law-making body of the city of Suva, Fiji's capital. It consisted of 20 councillors, elected for three-year terms from four multi-member constituencies, called wards. Councillors were elected by residents, landowners, and representatives of corporations owning or occupying taxable property in Suva councillors in turn elect, from among their own members, a lord mayor and deputy lord mayor, who served one-year terms and were eligible for re-election.

However, in 2009, the military-backed interim Fijian government dismissed all municipal government officials throughout Fiji and appointed special administrators to run the urban areas. , elected municipal government had not been restored. The special administrator of Suva, along with nearby Nasinu, is Chandu Umaria, a former lord mayor of Suva.

Landmarks

A well-known landmark is the Suva City Carnegie Library, which was built in 1909. It is one of many colonial-period buildings in the city. 

Another landmark is Suva's governmental building complex. It sits on what was once the flowing waters of a creek. In 1935, the creek was drained, and the complex's foundations were created by driving more than five kilometres of reinforced concrete pilings into its bed. The foundation stone was laid in 1937, the building complex was completed in 1939, and a new wing was completed in 1967. However, in 1992, the seat of Fiji's parliament was moved out of that complex and into a new one on Ratu Sukuna Road.

Government House was formerly the residence of Fiji's colonial governors and, after Fijian independence in 1970, governors-general. Today, it is the official residence of Fiji's president. The original house on the site was built in 1882, but a fire caused by a lightning strike destroyed it in 1921. It was rebuilt in 1928. 

The Suva campus of the University of the South Pacific (USP) occupies what was originally a New Zealand military base. It is the largest of the many USP campuses dotted throughout the South Pacific. USP is the largest university in the Pacific Islands outside Hawaii, and its courses are internationally recognised and endorsed.

The Fiji Museum, now located in Thurston Gardens, was founded in 1904, and originally occupied the old town hall. It was moved to its present location in 1954. The museum houses the most extensive collection of Fijian artifacts in the world, and is also a research and educational institution, specialising in archaeology, the preservation of Fiji's oral tradition, and the publication of material on Fiji's language and culture.

Suva has about 78 parks. The new Takashi Suzuki Garden, in Apted Park at Suva Point, is a popular spot for viewing sunrise and sunset. Thurston Gardens, which opened in 1913, features flora from throughout the South Pacific. 

Suva has many shopping and retail areas, notably Cumming Street, which has been a vibrant and colourful shopping area since colonial times. The Cumming Street area features original colonial buildings and narrow roads. Suva also has modern shopping malls, such as the Suva Central Shopping Mall, the Mid-City Mall, and MHCC, along with other developments give much of the city a modern and sophisticated look.

TappooCity is Fiji's largest shopping mall, and the largest in the South Pacific outside of Australia and New Zealand. This low-rise (six-storey) building was constructed in December 2009 in a joint venture by FNPF and the Tappoo Group of Companies. It is valued at US$25.7 million (FJD50 million). 

Construction work began in January 2011 for a FJD30 -million mini-mall complex at Grantham Road, behind the Sports-City Complex and close to the Suva campus of the University of the South Pacific. It was scheduled to be completed in 2012, and to house restaurants, retail outlets, and cinemas.

Economy

Unlike most cities and towns in Fiji, and many around the world, Suva did not grow up around a single industry. It has gradually developed to become the largest and most sophisticated city in the Pacific Islands, and a regional hub.  Fijians of Indian descent have largely shaped the economy of Fiji, contributing immensely to the growth of Suva and to its status as the economic and political capital of Fiji. Suva is the commercial center of Fiji: Most international banks have their Pacific headquarters here, including ANZ and the Westpac Bank. In addition, most Fijian financial institutions, non-governmental organisations, and government ministries and departments are headquartered here. At one point, both Air Pacific (now Fiji Airways) and Air Fiji were headquartered in Suva.

A large part of Fiji's international shipping, as well as the docking of international cruise ships, takes place at Suva's Kings Wharf. This has led to the growth of Suva's tourism industry.

The largest of Suva's several industrial areas is Walu Bay, which is home to factories, warehouses, import-export companies, shipyards, container yards, a brewery, and many printeries. Other notable industrial areas are Vatuwaqa, Raiwaqa, and Laucala Beach.

Suva boasts many thriving markets and shopping complexes. Among the most popular areas for shopping and commerce are Cumming Street and Victoria Parade.

Institutions

Suva is host to more international and regional intergovernmental agencies and NGOs than any other Pacific Island capital. Some of the bodies with a presence in Suva are:

The TRAFFIC Oceania South Pacific Programme – funded by the UK Foreign and Commonwealth Office, is in Suva, in the offices of the WWF South Pacific Programme. The programme assists in the implementation of CITES and strengthens collaboration with the World Wide Fund for Nature.
The Fiji School of Medicine – which is now classed as a regional agency and a member of the Council of Regional Organisations in the Pacific.
The University of Fiji.
The Fiji School of Nursing.
The University of the South Pacific which operates a campus in Suva as well as at other South Pacific locations.
The Fiji National University which is a major polytechnic in Fiji and caters to students from many small Pacific Island nations. It has centres in other Fiji towns of Nadi, Ba and Labasa.
The Fiji College of Advanced Learning.
TPAF (The Training and Productivity Authority of Fiji).
The Pacific Community (SPC).
The Pacific Islands Forum Secretariat.
The South Pacific Applied Geoscience Commission (SOPAC).
St John's Theological College, Suva.
 The Pacific Regional Seminary (PRS).
 The Pacific Theological College (PTC).
Femmus School of Hospitality.
Yat Sen School.
Alliance Française.
Greenpeace Pacific.
UNDP Headquarters (Papua New Guinea, Vanuatu, Fiji, Tonga, Samoa, Cook Islands, Palau, Micronesia, Marshall Islands, Tuvalu, Kiribati, Niue, Nauru).
Asian Development Bank Headquarters Pacific
World Bank Headquarters

Entertainment and culture

Suva is the cultural and entertainment capital of Oceania and is host to many regional, national, and local events. The city has a very developed and advanced entertainment and event infrastructure and hosts a busy calendar of events every year.

Venues
Suva has many multipurpose venues, the main ones being the Vodafone Arena, which can seat up to 5,000 people, the HFC Bank Stadium, which can seat up to 30,000 people, the FMF National Gymnasium Suva, which can seat up to 2,000 people, and the Civic Auditorium, which can seat up to 1,000 people.

Parks and gardens

Suva has a number of parks and a few gardens. Albert Park, in the City centre, is famous as the stage for many national-historical events such as the Independence of Fiji, the landing by Kingsford Smith on the Southern Cross and many parades and carnivals. Sukuna Park, also in the CBD is a popular recreational park and has many performances and events on a weekly basis. Thurston Gardens (named for Governor of Fiji John Bates Thurston) is the city's main botanical garden and the location of the Fiji Museum. Queen Elizabeth Drive is popular as a scenic walk along Suva's foreshore. Many city residents go to the Colo-i-Suva Forest Reserve, a short drive from the city centre, to swim under the waterfalls.

Music
Many concerts are held in Suva, some coming from other countries to enjoy world-class performances. Concerts and shows are usually staged at one of the above-mentioned venues on a monthly basis. Some of the famous music artists to hold shows in Suva include UB40, Lucky Dube, O'Yaba, Sean Kingston and many others. Due to a favoured interest in Bollywood by all, some prominent singers and actors have held shows in the capital which include singers like Shaan, Sonu Nigam, Sunidhi Chauhan and movie artists like Shah Rukh Khan, Priyanka Chopra, Johnny Lever, Dino Morea, Rajpal Yadav, Sunny Leone and the like.

Food
Suva offers a varied and interesting culinary experience where almost every if not all major cuisines are represented. Particularly popular cuisines are Fijian, Indian, Chinese, American and foods from other cultural and ethnic backgrounds. Fijians of Indian descent have influenced Fiji's cuisine, in the process creating the uniquely Fiji Indian curry. Indentured labourers brought with them spices, chilies, and other herbs and vegetables which now are part of the Fijian culinary experience.

Festivals
During the course of the year, arts, music and trade festivals are held in Suva, albeit on a small scale. There are a few large and notable festivals that occur annually and these include the Hibiscus Festival (largest carnival in the South Pacific islands), the New Years Street Party, and the Fiji Show Case tradeshow that includes carnival rides, food as well as magic and circus performances.

Night life
Suva has a vibrant nightlife where most nightclubs and bars open in the late afternoon and remain open until 5 am. Suva's nightlife caters to all tastes, moods, and likes. Food stalls are open throughout the night and the city is well-policed at night. Apart from nightclubs, there are lounges and bars that cater to those seeking low-key entertainment.

The seedier side of Suva is Victoria Parade where nightclubs such as Signals Night Club, East Court Restaurant, and Angel Night Club are located in the same stretch.

Cinema
Downtown Suva has one main cinema complex, Village Six, owned by the Damodar Brothers. The Regal and Phoenix theatres, once prominent cinema/theatre haunts before the new millennium owned by the Sharan Brothers, have since closed down. A second cinema complex is the Damodar City Complex, in the shopping area of Laucala Bay, which has a further six screens, along with shopping and eating outlets and cafes.

Another interesting feature of Suva is the increasing number of Bollywood films being shot in the capital.

Sports

Suva plays host to many regional and national sporting events, most notably at the HFC Bank Stadium. A special highlight is the Coca-Cola Games, the largest secondary school athletics meet in the world. The Capital City is represented in major sporting events by its respective rugby, netball and football teams.

Suva was the host of the first Pacific Games, in 1963. Forty years later in 2003 the Games returned to Fiji's capital, with a full program of 32 sports introduced for the first time. Suva held the games for the second time in 1979. Having hosted the event three times, Suva has held the Pacific Games more often than any other city.

Mass media

Headquartered in Suva are the three main national television stations, Fiji One, FBC TV and MAI TV along with the Fiji Ministry of Information, which produces government programs as well as national news and current affairs bulletins. Fiji One produces and airs its evening 'National News' bulletin from its studios in Gladstone Road in Central; FBC TV airs its 'FBC News' bulletin from its studios, also on Gladstone Road. Sky Pacific and Pacific Broadcasting Services Fiji are the two pay satellite television company headquartered here.

Suva is home to the national radio broadcasters Fiji Broadcasting Corporation (FBC) and Communications Fiji Limited (CFL), between them providing 12 national radio stations.

The two dailies, The Fiji Times and The Fiji Sun are printed here (and, formerly, the Fiji Post). Many other weekly newspapers are headquartered and published in Suva, including Inside Fiji, Nai Lalakai (iTaukei language weekly), Shanti Dut (Fiji Hindi weekly), national magazines such as Repúblika and Mai Life as well as regional magazines such as Islands Business.

Shopping and fashion

Suva is one of the most shopper-friendly cities in the Pacific. The city offers its shops in a cluster that is referred to as Suva Central. Areas like Cumming Street and Marks Street are for clothing, jewellery, food, electronics, pharmaceuticals and more. Terry Walk and the Flea Market offer handicrafts and local ware. Close by, huge, new shopping complexes dominate the canal area, such as MHCC (Morris Hedstrom City Center), Tappoo City and Suva Central. There are telecommunication and electronic stores, as well as sporting gear stores in the outer areas of this radius. 

Suva also hosts the headquarters of the Fashion Council of Fiji, the region's most significant fashion organisation. The Fijian Fashion Festival, the region's largest trade and consumer fashion platform, occurs annually at the Grand Pacific Hotel in Suva.

Transportation

Nausori International Airport caters mainly to the domestic market, connecting Suva with Fiji's other international airport, Nadi International Airport, and serves smaller international aircraft, at one time servicing Brisbane and Sydney routes. As of August 2010, Fiji Airways will operate a twice weekly flight from Nausori International Airport to Auckland, New Zealand to complement its 13 weekly flights from Nadi to Auckland, furthermore, the Nausori – Sydney route has resumed. The airport provides services to its immediate Pacific neighbours Tonga, Tuvalu and Vanuatu as well as the dependency of Rotuma.

Suva has a public transport system consisting of buses (Central Transport Co.) and taxis servicing the metropolitan area as well as the cities of Nasinu, Nausori, and Lami town. There are bus services connecting Suva with other towns and cities on Viti Levu by way of either the Kings, Queens, or Princes highways, all originating within Suva, although the latter terminates at Rewa Bridge in Nausori.

There is a domestic ferry service from the Princess Wharf to the outer islands of Fiji as well as Vanua Levu. International ships and cruise liners dock at Suva's Kings Wharf.

Notable residents 
This is a list of famous people who are either living in, or are originally from Suva.

Petero Civoniceva (born in Suva), Australian rugby league player
Noor Dean, a Fiji Indian lawyer and politician, Suva City Council, and House of Representatives
Josua Koroibulu, plays rugby league for the Fiji national rugby league team
Nalini Krishan, Star Wars film actress
Craig Parker, New Zealand actor
Paulini (born in Suva), Australian singer and songwriter
Semi Radradra, Parramatta Eels player and plays for the Fiji national rugby league team
Waisale Serevi, Fiji Rugby Team
Devanesh Sharma, leading Suva lawyer and former President of the Fiji Law Society
Jimmy Snuka, professional wrestler between 1968 and 2015
Sitiveni Sivivatu, All Black Chiefs (Super rugby franchise)
Semi Tadulala, plays rugby union for Gloucester Rugby in England and Fiji in rugby union previously a professional rugby league footballer for Melbourne Storm, Bradford Bulls and the Fiji national rugby league team
Lote Tuqiri, played rugby union for the Australian national rugby union team
Tarisi Vunidilo, Fijian archaeologist and curator
Marques Whippy, professional basketball player

Twin towns – sister cities

Suva is twinned with:

  Beihai, China
  Brighton, Australia
  Guangdong, China
  Frankston, Australia
  Port Moresby, Papua New Guinea
  Shaoxing, China
  Yongsan, Seoul, South Korea

  Virac, Catanduanes, Philippines

See also

 1953 Suva earthquake

Notes

References
Fiji, by Korina Miller, Robyn Jones, Leonardo Pinheiro – Travel – 2003, published by Lonely Planet, pages 139–141, details on Suva City.
The Suva City Library: A Brief History and Development, 1909–1980, by S Baksh – 1980
Pluralism and Social Change in Suva City, Fiji, by Alexander Mamak – 1974, Thesis/dissertation; Ethnology (Fiji, Suva City); Suva City, Fiji Islands (Social conditions)
A History of the Pacific Islands: Passages Through Tropical Time – Page 162, by Deryck Scarr 2001 – 323 pages.
Frommer's South Pacific, by Bill Goodwin – Travel – 2004, pages 258–263

External links 

Suva City Council (official website)

Capitals in Oceania
Rewa Province
Populated places in Fiji
Port cities in Oceania